Bond paper is a high-quality durable writing paper similar to bank paper but having a weight greater than 50 g/m2. The most common weights are 60 g/m2 (16 lb), 75 g/m2 (20 lb) and 90 g/m2 (24 lb). The name comes from its having originally been made for documents such as government bonds. It is now used for letterheads and other stationery and as paper for electronic printers. Widely employed for graphic work involving pencil, pen and felt-tip marker, bond paper can sometimes contain rag fibre pulp, which produces a stronger, though rougher, sheet of paper.

See also
 Coated paper, also high-quality, but bond paper may be coated or uncoated
 Inkjet paper
 Tracing paper

References 
 Webster's Third New International Dictionary
 Chamber's Science and Technology Dictionary, p. 103 

Printing and writing paper
Paper